Mikhail Ivanovich Tsaryov (November 18 [December 1] 1903, Tver —  November 10, 1987, Moscow) was a Soviet theater and film actor, theater director, master of the artistic word (reader). People's Artist of the USSR (1949). Hero of Socialist Labor (1973). The winner of the Stalin Prize of the second degree (1947) and the State Prize of the USSR (1969). Member of the CPSU (b) since 1949.

Filmography 

1932: First Platoon as Lieutenant Kerenko
1933:   The Storm as Boris Grigoryevich 
1934: Twice Born as Brovko
1936: Gobsek as old organ-grinder
1938: Treasure Island as Dr. Livesay
1942: Concert to the Front as reader  
1952: Woe from Wit   as Alexander Andreevich Chatsky
1952: There Are Enough Common People for Every Wise Man as  Glumov
1957:  Pigmalion as Henry Higgins
1958: The Poem of the Sea as Aristarkhov
1974: House of Ostrovsky as King Berendey
1981: Profitable Place as Aristarkh Vladimirovich Vyshnevsky

References

External links 
 
 Страница памяти на сайте Малого театра

1903 births
1987 deaths
Soviet theatre directors
Heroes of Socialist Labour
Recipients of the Order of Lenin
Soviet male film actors
Soviet male stage actors
Soviet male television actors
People's Artists of the USSR
Honored Artists of the RSFSR
Stalin Prize winners
Recipients of the USSR State Prize
Communist Party of the Soviet Union members
Spoken word artists
Burials at Vagankovo Cemetery
Russian drama teachers
Soviet drama teachers